Masters of Illusion is an American television magic show broadcast on Pax TV from 2000 to 2001, which was performed on the grand stage at the Magic Castle in Hollywood, California. The show was later revived in 2009 and broadcast on MyNetworkTV. In 2012, the show was presented as four different specials and run in syndication. The show derives its name from the profession's term Master of Illusion. The series has been revived by The CW with new episodes in 2014, featuring new performers and hosted by Dean Cain. On January 20, 2022, The CW renewed the series for a twelfth season which premiered on February 11, 2023.
Audience participants are 99% friends of the "magician."

Series overview

Episodes

Season 1 (2000–01)

Season 2 (2009)

Season 3 (2012)

Season 4 (2014–15)

Season 5 (2015)

Season 6 (2016)

Season 7 (2017)

Season 8 (2018)

Season 9 (2019)

Season 10 (2020)

Season 11 (2022)

Special (2022)

Season 12 (2023)

See also
Academy of Magical Arts

References

2000s American reality television series
2010s American reality television series
2020s American reality television series
2000 American television series debuts
2001 American television series endings
2009 American television series debuts
2009 American television series endings
2014 American television series debuts
American television magic shows
American television series revived after cancellation
PAX TV original programming
The CW original programming
MyNetworkTV original programming
First-run syndicated television programs in the United States
Television series by Associated Television International
Television series by Sony Pictures Television